Marisol rumbo a Río is a 1963 Spanish musical film. It was the fourth movie to star child singer and actress Marisol and it is considered the beginning of her transitional/adolescent stage.

Music 
 "Pide"
 "Muchachita"
 "Guajiras"
 "Bossa nova junto a ti"
 "Tony"
 "Sueño de Marisol"
 "Vistas de Río"
 "Créditos"
 "Corcovado"

References 
 

Spanish musical films
1960s Spanish-language films
1963 musical films
1963 films
1960s Spanish films